The lightweight division in mixed martial arts contains different weight classes:

 The UFC's lightweight division, which groups competitors within 146 to 155 lb (66 to 70 kg)
 The Shooto lightweight division, which limits competitors to 145 lb (65.8 kg)
The ONE Championship's lightweight division, with an upper limit at 
The Road FC's lightweight division, with an upper limit at 154 lb (70 kg)

Ambiguity and clarification
For the sake of uniformity, most American mixed martial arts media outlets consider Lightweight competitors to be between 146 and 155 lb (66 and 70 kg). This encompasses The Shooto Welterweight division (154 lb / 70 kg).

The UFC's lightweight division was reinstated at UFC 58 after falling into disuse following UFC 49. Sean Sherk, a former welterweight contender, defeated Kenny Florian at UFC 64, becoming the first UFC lightweight champion since 2002.

The lightweight limit, as defined by the Nevada State Athletic Commission and the Association of Boxing Commissions is 155 lb (70 kg).

Professional champions

Current champions
This table last updated in February 2023.

Most wins in lightweight title bouts 

Note: the list includes wins in bouts for lightweight titles of major promotions (UFC, Strikeforce, WEC, Bellator)
Note: the list includes both undisputed and interim champions
 Active title reign

Most consecutive defenses of lightweight title

See also
List of current MMA Lightweight champions
List of UFC Lightweight Champions
List of Strikeforce Lightweight Champions
List of Pancrase Lightweight Champions
List of Road FC Lightweight Champions

Notes

a.Edgar's title defense against Gray Maynard at UFC 125 was a split draw. Edgar retained the Lightweight title. The two later rematched at UFC 136, with Edgar defeating Maynard via KO and defending his title.

References

External links

 
Mixed martial arts weight classes